Rachel Bean is a cosmologist and theoretical astrophysicist. She is a professor of astronomy at Cornell University.

Education 
Bean received her bachelor’s degree (Natural Sciences) from Cambridge University (1995). After graduation, she worked in the Strategy Division at Accenture before returning to academia. She received her master’s (1999) and doctorate (2002) in theoretical physics from Imperial College London. She did postdoctoral research at Princeton University, before becoming a faculty member at Cornell University in 2005.

Research 
Bean’s research focuses on cosmological tests of the nature of dark energy and gravity, and the physical origins of primordial inflation, using data from large-scale structure and the cosmic microwave background.  She is actively involved in a number of international astronomical surveys including the Large Synoptic Survey Telescope (LSST), the Dark Energy Spectroscopic Instrument (DESI), and the Euclid mission.

Awards 

 2018 Breakthrough Prize in Fundamental Physics (for the results of the WMAP mission)
 2016 Fellow, American Physical Society
 2012 Gruber Prize in Cosmology, for the results of the Wilkinson Microwave Anisotropy Probe (WMAP) mission
 2010 Presidential Early Career Award for Scientists and Engineers (PECASE)
 2008 Cottrell Scholar Award, Research Corporation. 
 2007 NASA Group Achievement Award (for the results of the WMAP mission)

References

Year of birth missing (living people)
Living people
Fellows of the American Physical Society
American women astronomers
Cornell University faculty
Alumni of the University of Cambridge
Alumni of Imperial College London
Recipients of the Presidential Early Career Award for Scientists and Engineers